Daniel Brunhart (born 18 June 1968) is a retired male judoka from Liechtenstein, who competed for his native country at the 1988 Summer Olympics in Seoul, South Korea. There he was eliminated in the first round of the Men's Extra-Lightweight (– 60 kg) division by Great Britain's former bronze medalist Neil Eckersley. Brunhart was one out of four judokas from Liechtenstein competing in South Korea; the other ones being Arnold Frick, Magnus Büchel, and Johannes Wohlwend.

References
sports-reference

1968 births
Living people
Liechtenstein male judoka
Judoka at the 1988 Summer Olympics
Olympic judoka of Liechtenstein